Benjamin French, known professionally as Frenchy, or by his YouTube channel name Frenchy SungaAttack, is an Australian comedian and YouTuber. His YouTube channel has more than 700,000 subscribers.

Early life 
Frenchy describes himself as being from the "ghettos of Wollongong", referring to Austinmer, a Wollongong suburb.

Frenchy describes his parents as "polite and good Christian people; they don’t really swear or drink and they’re not really too fond of my style of comedy", also adding: "My parents cannot sit through my videos … They’re just happy I’m not teaching any more."

Career 
Frenchy initially began his career as a substitute teacher before becoming a comedian. French taught at Keira High and Warilla, Corrimal, Bulli and Woonona high schools; however, his video content eventually led to the end of his career by the Board of Studies. According to Frenchy, he filmed videos in the school with his students (per permission forms) and with the principal's permission; however, as a result of a couple students forging the forms, their parents complained to the principal leading to the conclusion of his teaching career.

ABC and Illawarra Mercury describe Frenchy's humour to be blue collar, drawing on "past relationships, Tinder encounters, bloke culture and time spent in nightclubs and schools". In his videos, which are mainly short skits, Frenchy includes characters such as his close friends and girlfriend.

Following Frenchy publishing a satirical video mocking his hometown Wollongong, he has been accused of "trying to make a quick buck" and putting the "region’s tourism industry at risk."

References 

Australian comedians
Australian male comedians
21st-century Australian comedians
Australian stand-up comedians
Year of birth missing (living people)
Living people